Priscillia Annen (born 4 June 1992) is a Swiss freestyle skier. She competed in the 2018 Winter Olympics.

References

1992 births
Living people
Freestyle skiers at the 2018 Winter Olympics
Swiss female freestyle skiers
Olympic freestyle skiers of Switzerland
21st-century Swiss women